The Port of Felixstowe, in Felixstowe, Suffolk, is the United Kingdom's busiest container port, dealing with 48% of Britain's containerised trade.

The port is operated by the Felixstowe Dock and Railway Company, which was set up under an Act of Parliament, the Felixstowe Railway and Pier Act 1875, and so is one of the few limited companies in the UK that do not have the word "Limited" in their name.  Much of the land on which it sits is owned by Trinity College, Cambridge, which in the 1930s bought some land near Felixstowe which included a dock that was too small to be included in the National Dock Labour Scheme. In 1967, it set up Britain's first container terminal for £3.5m in a deal with Sea-Land Service. Because container shipping is much more economically efficient in bulk, this early start led to it becoming the UK's largest container port, despite its previous insignificance to the shipping market.

Felixstowe is owned by Hutchison Port Holdings (HPH) Group and has always been privately owned. In 1951, Gordon Parker, an agricultural merchant, bought the Felixstowe Dock & Railway Company, which at the time was handling only grain and coal. In 1976, Felixstowe was bought by European Ferries. In June 1991, P&O sold Felixstowe to Hutchison Whampoa of Hong Kong for £90m. In June 1994, Hutchison Whampoa's Hutchison International Port Holdings bought out Orient Overseas International's 25% stake in Felixstowe for £50m. On 21 August 2022, the first strike in thirty years occurred when about 1,900 Unite members walked out in a dispute over pay. 

The port has its own Port of Felixstowe Police, fire, and ambulance services.

Description

Terminals

The port has two main container terminals, Trinity and Landguard, as well as a roll-on/roll-off terminal.

The main navigation channel is dredged to 14.5 metres below chart datum, with a maximum depth of 15 metres alongside the quay. This allows Felixstowe to accommodate the world's latest generation of deep-draughted post-Panamax vessels and the much larger Maersk Triple E class, launched in 2013 and capable of carrying 18,000 TEUs.

Transport connections
The A14 connects the port to the English Midlands and the M6, the north via the M1 and M6 and A1 and via the A12 to London. The port (as simply "Felixstowe") is signed from as far away as M6 junction 1 for Rugby.

Each terminal has its own rail terminal which connects to the Felixstowe Branch Line.

Seafarers and crew welfare
Seafarers' welfare charity Apostleship of the Sea, which provides practical and pastoral support to seafarers, has a port chaplain based at Felixstowe port.

Current developments

Felixstowe South

In 2008, work began on the construction and reconfiguration of Felixstowe South terminal creating 1,300 m of quay served by 12 new ship-to-shore gantry cranes. Work will be carried out in two stages with 750 m of sea wall complete by the end of 2010 and stage which is expected to open in 2014. This new terminal will have a clearance of 16 m and gantries suited for extra large box carriers.

Felixstowe and Nuneaton freight capacity scheme

The railway track between Felixstowe and Nuneaton has been upgraded to allow for more freight trains by clearing the route to W10 loading gauge, allowing 'Hi-cube' shipping containers to be carried between the Port of Felixstowe and the West Coast Main Line at Nuneaton. The West Coast Main Line had previously been cleared to W10 and the route from Nuneaton to Birmingham was already cleared to W12.

This work will accommodate additional freight traffic as a result of 'Felixstowe South' expansion at the Port of Felixstowe. It will also allow the newer high-cube containers to be carried by train - and the percentage of these containers is expected to increase from 30% in 2007 to 50% in 2012. Network Rail completed the gauge enhancement from Ipswich to Peterborough in 2008. Work should be completed by 2014 at an estimated cost of £291 million.

Copdock Roundabout

As part of the Felixstowe South development, Hutchison Ports will provide financial support intended to increase capacity at the Copdock interchange (J55) between the A14 and the A12.

2022 dockers' strike 
The dispute followed the Felixstowe Dock and Railway Company offering a pay increase of 5%. Unite reported that this equated to a real-terms pay cut with retail price inflation at 11.9%. In 2021, dock workers received a below inflation pay increase of 1.4%. In July 2022, Unite members at Felixstowe voted on industrial action and workers recorded a 92% yes vote on an 81% turnout. In August, dock workers walked out from the site in the first industrial action of its kind in 30 years. Coverage of the industrial action revealed that some Felixstowe dockers relied on the support of food banks and were struggling to make mortgage payments. Trade union communications by Unite used the hashtag #DockersDeserveBetter. 

In a press statement, General Secretary of Unite, Sharon Graham said:

The bottom line is this is an extremely wealthy company that can fully afford to give its workers a pay rise. Instead it chose to give bonanza pay outs to shareholders touching £100 million.

On August 24 footage and photographs recorded a port worker carrying a Unite the Union flag surfed in front of an Evergreen Marine Corp container ship. The footage was published on Twitter by trade unionist and Labour councillor Lauren Townsend and included a sample from AC/DC's Back in Black.

References

Further reading
BRITISH TRANSPORT DOCKS (FELIXSTOWE) BILL Discussion in the Commons - 1976
Thinking inside the box BBC News article about growth of the port

External links

 
 The Port of Britain - Official microsite

Ports and harbours of Suffolk
Container terminals
CK Hutchison Holdings
Port